The Iranians' Party was a small political party in Iran during the Pahlavi dynasty. The party had one seat in the 23rd Majlis, the election of which was held in 1971.

The party's central committee was dominated by intellectuals and university professors. It claimed university students and guild members.

Election results

Parliamentary elections

References 

Political parties established in 1970
1970 establishments in Iran
Political parties disestablished in 1975
1975 disestablishments in Iran
Nationalist parties in Asia
Anti-communist parties